The 2019–20 season is Nueva Chicago's 5th consecutive season in the second division of Argentine football, Primera B Nacional.

The season generally covers the period from 1 July 2019 to 30 June 2020.

Review

Pre-season
On 11 June, forward David Achucarro headed off to Colombian football with Cúcuta Deportivo. Nueva Chicago kicked off their off-season signings with three announcements, as Gonzalo Menéndez's arrival from Deportivo Santaní was followed by the captures of Federico Vasilchik (Ferro Carril Oeste) and Horacio Martínez (Atlanta). On the same day, Juan Cruz Monteagudo agreed a loan to Deportes Puerto Montt of Primera B de Chile. 23 June saw Bolivia's Oriente Petrolero sign Nicolás Franco, while Mirko Luna moved to Chilean Primera División side O'Higgins on loan on 28 June. 2018–19 loans ended in June. Santiago González was loaned from San Lorenzo on 30 June. On 1 July, Cata Díaz penned from Fuenlabrada while Christian Gómez announced his retirement.

Álvaro Pavón and César More arrived from San Jorge on 10 July. Paul Charpentier was loaned to Sacachispas on 10 July, while Adrián Scifo left a day later to Santamarina. Boca Juniors Reserves got the better of Nueva Chicago in 17 July friendlies in Ezeiza, as they followed a 0–0 draw with a three-goal victory. Valentín Viola came to Nueva Chicago on 18 July, following the left winger's departure from San Martín (T). Leonardo Baima signed on a free transfer from Chacarita Juniors on 19 July. 20 July saw Nueva Chicago go unbeaten in games with Sportivo Italiano of Primera C Metropolitana. Aldo Araujo's loan from Talleres was officialised on 22 July. Nueva held consecutive ties with Argentino on 24 July. An exhibition with Uruguay's Fénix was cancelled on 26 July.

30 July saw Nueva play Alvarado in a friendly fixture, with the newly-promoted Primera B Nacional team coming out on top following a draw and a win. Uruguayan attacking midfielder Matías Santos joined from Defensor Sporting on 31 July. Nueva's final opponents of pre-season were Almagro, who they beat in two matches at the Estadio Nueva Chicago. Emiliano Trovento joined on 3 August. Rodrigo Izco became Gastón Esmerado's twelfth reinforcement on 5 August, as he agreed terms from Comunicaciones. A season-long loan move for Mauricio Asenjo from Banfield was confirmed on 14 August, on the same date that Christian Gómez divulged a temporary halt to his retirement - resigning in order to make a farewell cameo on matchday five in the league against Atlanta.

August
Nueva's new campaign in Primera B Nacional got underway with a goalless draw at home to Deportivo Morón on 19 August.
Another tie followed on matchday two, as they visited Temperley and drew 1–1 with Leonardo Baima scoring.

September
On 3 September, Nueva Chicago made it three ties on the bounce after a score draw with Platense.

Squad

Transfers
Domestic transfer windows:3 July 2019 to 24 September 201920 January 2020 to 19 February 2020.

Transfers in

Transfers out

Loans in

Loans out

Friendlies

Pre-season
An exhibition match with Almagro, set for 3 August 2019, was scheduled on 3 July. Argentino revealed a friendly with Nueva Chicago on 9 July. They'd also face Boca Juniors Reserves in Ezeiza and Sportivo Italiano in Buenos Aires. Nueva Chicago also agreed a friendly with Uruguayan club Fénix. Matches were also set with Alvarado and Almagro.

Competitions

Primera B Nacional

Results summary

Matches
The fixtures for the 2019–20 league season were announced on 1 August 2019, with a new format of split zones being introduced. Nueva Chicago were drawn in Zone A.

Squad statistics

Appearances and goals

Statistics accurate as of 4 September 2019.

Goalscorers

Notes

References

Club Atlético Nueva Chicago seasons
Nueva Chicago